Wolfe Tones GAA is a Gaelic Athletic Association club located in Mostrim, County Longford, Ireland. The club is solely concerned with the game of hurling.

Honours

 Longford Senior Hurling Championship (20): 1992, 1993, 1994, 1995, 1996, 1998, 1999, 2002, 2004, 2007, 2008, 2009, 2010, 2013, 2014, 2015, 2016, 2017, 2018, 2020

External links
Mostrim GAA site

Gaelic games clubs in County Longford
Hurling clubs in County Longford